"Champion of the World" is a song by British rock band Coldplay from their eighth studio album Everyday Life. It was first released on 20 November 2019 along with "Daddy" in anticipation for the record. Despite being sent to selected radio stations in the United States and Italy, the song was not marketed as an official single.

Overview 
"Champion of the World" is the seventh track of the Sunset part of the album and was written by the members of Coldplay. The song contains elements from "Los Angeles, Be Kind" by Scott Hutchison's solo project Owl John, as explained by Chris Martin.I want to acknowledge Scott Hutchison from Owl John, on the song "Champion of the World". He had a song called "Los Angeles, Be Kind", which I love. When I first heard it, I thought it was going to go one way; but it went another. Anyway "Champion of the World" is the song that came from following the other path, and that’s why Scott is a co-writer on this song.

– Chris Martin

Music video 
On 25 February 2020 a music video was made available on Coldplay official YouTube channel. The video was filmed in Los Angeles, and was directed by French director Cloé Bailly, who said that the video is about this magic power that kids have to switch off from reality and jump into their own world.

Track listing

Charts

Release history

References 

2020 singles
2019 songs
Coldplay songs
Parlophone singles
Songs written by Chris Martin
Songs written by Guy Berryman
Songs written by Jonny Buckland
Songs written by Will Champion